Dobbs Ferry is a village in Westchester County, New York, United States. The population was 10,875 according to the 2010 United States Census. In 2021, its population rose to an estimated 11,456. The village of Dobbs Ferry is located in, and is a part of, the town of Greenburgh. The village ZIP code is 10522. Most of the village falls within the boundaries of the Dobbs Ferry Union Free School District.

Dobbs Ferry was ranked seventh in the list of the top 10 places to live in New York State for 2014, according to the national online real estate brokerage Movoto. Dobbs Ferry is also the first village in New York State certified as a Climate Smart Community and was granted in 2014 the highest level given out in the state.

History
Multiple groups of native peoples lived in what is now known as Dobbs Ferry since at least 4500BC. The most recent tribe who claimed territory of the area are the Wecquaesgeek, maintaining villages up until the 1600's. Numerous artifacts from the tribe continue to be found along Wicker's Creek in oyster middens.

Dobbs Ferry was named after Jeremiah Dobbs, a descendant of William Dobbs, of Swedish and Dutch ancestry whose family ran a ferry service that traversed the Hudson River at this location. Dobbs was a fisherman and settled near the southern part of what is now Dobbs Ferry, and he "added to his meager income by ferriage of occasional travelers across the Hudson. He used a style of boat known at that day as a periauger, a canoe hollowed out of a solid log. . . From this primitive ferry the village took its name."

Dobbs Ferry played a vital role in the American Revolutionary War. The position of the village opposite the northernmost end of the Palisades gave it importance during the war. The region was repeatedly raided by camp followers of each army; earthworks and a fort, commanding the Hudson ferry and the ferry to Paramus, New Jersey, were built; the British army made Dobbs Ferry a rendezvous, after the Battle of White Plains in November 1776, and the continental division under General Benjamin Lincoln was here at the end of January 1777.

In July and August 1781, during the seventh year of the war, Continental Army troops commanded by General George Washington were encamped in Dobbs Ferry and neighboring localities, alongside allied French forces under the command of the Comte de Rochambeau. A large British army controlled Manhattan at the time, and Washington chose the Dobbs Ferry area for encampment because he hoped to probe for weaknesses in the British defenses, just  to the south. But on August 14, 1781, a communication was received from French Admiral Comte de Grasse in the West Indies, which caused Washington to change his strategy. Washington's new strategy, adopted and designed in mid-August 1781, at the encampment of the allied armies, would win the war. The allied armies were ordered to break camp on August 19, 1781: on that date the Americans took the first steps of their march to Virginia along present-day Ashford Avenue and Broadway, en route to victory over General Cornwallis at the Siege of Yorktown and to victory in the Revolutionary War.

The village was originally incorporated in 1873 as Greenburgh, but the name was changed to Dobbs Ferry in 1882.

The current local government of Dobbs Ferry is headed by Mayor Vincent Rossillo, a Democrat, who was elected in November 2019.

The Estherwood and Carriage House, Hyatt-Livingston House, South Presbyterian Church, and United States Post Office are listed on the National Register of Historic Places.

Demographics

As of the census of 2000, there were 10,622 people, 3,792 households, and 2,570 families residing in the village. The population density was 4,350.0 people per square mile (1,680.8 per km2). There were 3,941 housing units at an average density of 1,614.0 per square mile (623.6 per km2). The racial makeup of the village was 80.70% White, 7.38% African American, 0.08% Native American, 7.56% Asian, 0.09% Pacific Islander, 1.93% from other races, and 2.26% from two or more races. Hispanic or Latino of any race were 7.00% of the population.

There were 3,792 households, out of which 34.5% had children under the age of 18 living with them, 54.8% were married couples living together, 10.0% had a female householder with no husband present, and 32.2% were non-families. Of all households, 27.6% were made up of individuals, and 8.4% had someone living alone who was 65 years of age or older. The average household size was 2.55 and the average family size was 3.13.

In the village, the population was spread out, with 26.0% under the age of 18, 7.3% from 18 to 24, 27.4% from 25 to 44, 24.1% from 45 to 64, and 15.2% who were 65 years of age or older. The median age was 39 years. For every 100 females, there were 95.7 males. For every 100 females age 18 and over, there were 84.5 males.

The median income for a household in the village was $70,333, and the median income for a family was $93,127. Males had a median income of $65,532 versus $50,091 for females. The per capita income for the village was $35,090. About 1.8% of families and 5.8% of the population were below the poverty line, including 4.8% of those under age 18 and 7.2% of those age 65 or over.

Geography

Dobbs Ferry is located at  (41.012729, −73.866026).

The village is bounded on the west by the Hudson River, and on the east by the Saw Mill River. Wickers Creek (name derived from the indigenous Weckquaesgeek) runs east to west through the center of the village from its main source in the Juhring Nature Preserve, Todd's Pond.

The village consists of a series of neighborhoods as defined in the 2010 Vision Plan, the Master Plan for the village.  These neighborhoods are not popularly recognized as of 2014.  As the Vision Plan states, "Sometimes the boundaries of these neighborhoods are clearly defined, but other times less so.  Where necessary, boundaries have been interpolated."  The neighborhoods are: Springhurst Park, Broadway, Wickers Creek, Waterfront, Old Town, Fairmead, Riverview Manor, Villard, Osborne, Belden, Maple, Walgrove, Virginia, Beacon Hill, Campuses and Woods, Parkway, Southfield, Knoll, Northfield, and Juhring. (Homes in Juhring are commonly referred to by real estate brokers as part of the Ardsley Park neighborhood, which encompasses the Juhring neighborhood in Dobbs Ferry and the Ardsley-on-Hudson neighborhood of Irvington, New York).

Climate

Education
A majority of the village is within the Dobbs Ferry Union Free School District, which consists of Springhurst Elementary, grades K–5, Dobbs Ferry Middle School, grades 6–8, and the Dobbs Ferry High School, grades 9–12.

Mercy College, a private institution with undergraduate and graduate programs, has its main campus in Dobbs Ferry. Our Lady of Victory Academy, a local parochial school offering grades 9–12 for girls, was located on the campus of Mercy College until its closing in 2011.

The Masters School is a private school located south of the town center that offers grades 5–12 for boys and girls. It is a boarding or day school that was founded in 1877 by Eliza Masters. The school contains a mansion called Estherwood.

An Alcott Montessori School is located in the town.

Public transit
Almost 10% of households do not own a car and rely on public transit, bicycling, and walking.

Several lines of the Bee-Line Bus System run through Dobbs Ferry, facilitating north-south travel along the Broadway/Route 9 corridor and east-west along Ashford Avenue.  The village operates a shuttle bus from the train station in the afternoon and evenings.

Commuter rail service to Grand Central Terminal is available via the Dobbs Ferry station, served by Metro-North Railroad. The train runs on the Hudson Line, and travel time from Dobbs Ferry to Grand Central Terminal is approximately 37 minutes on an express train and 43 minutes on a local train.  Many Metro North riders connect to the New York City Subway's  at Marble Hill to reach destinations on the west side of Manhattan, or at Harlem–125th Street station for the Upper East Side.

Amtrak inter-city rail trains travel on the Hudson Line tracks, but trains do not stop in the village. The closest Amtrak stations are Yonkers and Croton–Harmon stations.

Culture
In 2018 Brooke Lea Foster of The New York Times stated that it was one of several "Rivertowns" in New York State, which she described as among the "least suburban of suburbs, each one celebrated by buyers there for its culture and hip factor, as much as the housing stock and sophisticated post-city life." Of those, Foster stated that Dobbs Ferry had the most ethnic/cultural diversity.

Parks and recreation 
The village's Recreation Department runs a variety of programs out of the Embassy Community Center, including art and dance classes, sports leagues, summer camp, and other activities open to the public.  Programs for older adults are also well-funded and used.  Additional sports leagues for baseball and soccer are run independently but use village facilities.

There are a variety of village public parks, in order of size: 
Juhring Nature Preserve, a 76-acre wooded park with trail entrances from the Ardsley Park (Juhring), Northfield, and Knoll neighborhoods in Dobbs Ferry.
Waterfront Park on the Hudson River shoreline with playground, soccer field, and open space.  It serves as the site of the Dobbs Ferry Union Free School District graduation ceremony, summer concerts, and Independence Day fireworks.
Gould Park in the center of the Village, with a public swimming pool, playground, basketball court, and multi-sport ballfields.
Memorial Park has a wading pool, baseball field, basketball court, and bocce court. In 2014, the American Legion Post 148, which leased space in the park, collapsed and was razed.
 Chauncey Park along the Saw Mill River

Two linear parks used for active transportation and recreation traverse Dobbs Ferry as well.  The Old Croton Aqueduct Trailway, a linear State Park, runs north-south through the village on its western side.  The South County Trailway, a linear Westchester County park also runs north-south through the village, but on its eastern side along the bank of the Saw Mill River. There are also segments of trails unconnected to each other, including the Gateway Trail near Estherwood Avenue and Spoiler's Run near Belden Avenue.

Emergency services

Dobbs Ferry is served by a paid police department, a volunteer fire department (housing three pumpers and one tower ladder in two firehouses) and a volunteer ambulance corps (possessing two ambulances (one equipped with four-wheel-drive) and a fire rehab unit). As a part of the Town of Greenburgh, the village is eligible for additional coverage from the town services. Mutual aid agreements exist with neighboring municipalities for further coverage.

Notable people

 Jane Alexander, actress
 Jacob M. Appel, novelist, essayist
 Rex Beach, novelist, playwright, and Olympic water polo player, whose most famous novel is commemorated by the Spoiler's Run walking/bike trail.
 Mark Blount, NBA basketball player
 Jason Blum, film producer
 Bradley Bolke (1925–2019), voice actor
 William C. Conner (1920–2009), federal judge for the United States District Court for the Southern District of New York
 Augusta Dabney (1918–2008), actress
 Alvin Dark (1922–2014), Major League Baseball player and manager
 Cyrus West Field, inventor of electromagnetic trans-Atlantic telecommunication
 Paul Fix (1901–1983), film and television character actor
 Jean Fritz, author
 Max Greenfield, actor
Bernice Gottlieb, pioneer in trans-racial adoption movement
 Edwin Gould, early 20th century railroad executive and son of robber baron Jay Gould
 Lewis Hine (1874–1940), sociologist and photographer
 Joel Higgins, actor
 Robert G. Ingersoll (1833–1899), lawyer, politician, orator, advocate of agnosticism
 J. Howard Kitching, Civil War brevet Brigadier General
 Eric Paschall, NBA basketball player
 Sarah Jessica Parker, actress
 Stone Phillips (born 1954), former co-anchor of Dateline NBC
 Dusty Rhodes, baseball player, member of 1954 World Series champion New York Giants
 James Henry Salisbury, M.D. (1823–1905) 19th-century American physician, and the inventor of the Salisbury steak.
Charles Sheeler (1883–1965), artist and photographer
 Fanny Garrison Villard (1844-1928), co-founder of the NAACP, and leader of women's suffrage movement
 Henry Villard (1835-1900), journalist, newspaper publisher, financier and railroad baron.
 Mark Zuckerberg, co-founder of Facebook
 Randi Zuckerberg, Marketing Director of Facebook

References

Further reading
 Borkow, Richard. George Washington's Westchester Gamble: The Encampment on the Hudson and the Trapping of Cornwallis. 2011. .

External links

 
 Village of Dobbs Ferry official website
 The Rivertowns Enterprise, hometown newspaper
 Dobbs Ferry Conference 1781

Greenburgh, New York
New York (state) populated places on the Hudson River
Villages in Westchester County, New York